Heliophanus canariensis is a jumping spider species in the genus Heliophanus.  It was first described by Wanda Wesołowska in 1986 and lives on the Canary Islands.

References

Spiders described in 1986
Salticidae
Spiders of the Canary Islands
Taxa named by Wanda Wesołowska